Toshinaga is a masculine Japanese given name.

Possible writings
Toshinaga can be written using different combinations of kanji characters. Some examples:

敏永, "agile, eternity"
敏長, "agile, long/leader"
俊永, "talented, eternity"
俊長, "talented, long/leader"
利永, "benefit, eternity"
利長, "benefit, long/leader"
年永, "year, eternity"
年長, "year, long/leader"
寿永, "long life, eternity"
寿長, "long life, long/leader"

The name can also be written in hiragana としなが or katakana トシナガ.

Notable people with the name
Toshinaga Honda (本多 利長, 1635–1693), Japanese daimyō.
Toshinaga Maeda (前田 利長, 1562–1614), Japanese daimyō.
Toshinaga Saito (斎藤 利永, ????–1460), Japanese daimyō.

Japanese masculine given names